Steve Francis Jones (born 18 October 1960) is an English former footballer who played as a midfielder. He started his professional career with Manchester United before moving to Port Vale.

Career
Jones was signed by Manchester United, but did not make a senior first team appearance for the "Red Devils" before joining Port Vale in July 1979. He played sixteen games in 1979–80, scoring his first senior goal in a final day 3–0 win over Doncaster Rovers at Vale Park, as the "Valiants" finished 20th in the Fourth Division. He opened the 1980–81 season with a goal, in another 3–0 home win over Doncaster Rovers, but went on to suffer a broken collarbone and finished the season with fourteen appearances to his name. He left Vale by mutual consent in June 1981, having played 30 games in league and cup competitions.

Career statistics
Source:

References

1960 births
Living people
Footballers from Liverpool
English footballers
Association football midfielders
Manchester United F.C. players
Port Vale F.C. players
English Football League players